Mahmoud Qassem (Arabic:محمود قاسم) (born 8 September 1987) is an Emirati footballer. He currently plays for Al Dhaid.

References

External links
 

Emirati footballers
1987 births
Living people
Al Ahli Club (Dubai) players
Al Shabab Al Arabi Club Dubai players
Hatta Club players
Emirates Club players
Al Dhaid SC players
UAE First Division League players
UAE Pro League players
Association football defenders